The Town with Bad Wiring is the third album by American band The Upsidedown.

Track listing
All songs written by J. Atoms unless otherwise stated.

 "Something Good" - 3:09
 "Your Sister's Cool" – 6:51
 "La Paloma" - 3:54
 "Town with Bad Wiring" - 7:25
 "God's Bare Hands" - 3:51
 "Wounded Knee" - 4:19
 "Hang On" – 6:48
 "Whiskey Boots of Snake" - 3:44
 "Spiders" - 4:18
 "Indio Bernice" – 5:22
 "Night Kissed" – 5:46
 "Katydid" – 7:18

Notes
 Videos for "Something Good" (directors: Cairey Haider and Justin Adams), "God's Bare Hands" (director: Justin Adams), and "Hang On" (director: Justin Adams) have been filmed.
 The Upsidedown performed La Paloma with R.E.M.'s Peter Buck on November 5, 2010, at the Albert Rose Theater for an OPB event.

Personnel
Jsun Atoms – Vocals, guitars, keys
Brett Kron – Guitars
Matt Moore – Guitars, vocals
Tristan Evans – Bass guitar, vocals
Bob Graham Mild – Drums and percussion 
Jason 'Plucky' Anchondo – Drums and percussion

References

2010 albums
The Upsidedown albums